Qarayeh Seydnur (also Romanized as Qarayeh Seydnūr; also known as Seydnor) is a village in Jargalan Rural District, Raz and Jargalan District, Bojnord County, North Khorasan Province, Iran. At the 2006 census, its population was 192, in 55 families.

References 

Populated places in Bojnord County